Ceratinopsis monticola, is a species of spider of the genus Ceratinopsis. It is endemic to Sri Lanka.

See also
 List of Linyphiidae species

References

Linyphiidae
Invertebrates of Sri Lanka
Spiders of Asia
Spiders described in 1894